Conrado Estrella may refer to:

 Conrado Estrella Sr. (1917–2011), Filipino politician, grandfather of Conrado Estrella III
 Conrado Estrella III (born 1960), Filipino politician